In differential geometry, an affine connection is a geometric object on a smooth manifold which connects nearby tangent spaces, so it permits tangent vector fields to be differentiated as if they were functions on the manifold with values in a fixed vector space. Connections are among the simplest methods of defining differentiation of the sections of vector bundles.

The notion of an affine connection has its roots in 19th-century geometry and tensor calculus, but was not fully developed until the early 1920s, by Élie Cartan (as part of his general theory of connections) and Hermann Weyl (who used the notion as a part of his foundations for general relativity). The terminology is due to Cartan and has its origins in the identification of tangent spaces in Euclidean space  by translation: the idea is that a choice of affine connection makes a manifold look infinitesimally like Euclidean space not just smoothly, but as an affine space.

On any manifold of positive dimension there are infinitely many affine connections. If the manifold is further endowed with a metric tensor then there is a natural choice of affine connection, called the Levi-Civita connection. The choice of an affine connection is equivalent to prescribing a way of differentiating vector fields which satisfies several reasonable properties (linearity and the Leibniz rule). This yields a possible definition of an affine connection as a covariant derivative or (linear) connection on the tangent bundle. A choice of affine connection is also equivalent to a notion of parallel transport, which is a method for transporting tangent vectors along curves. This also defines a parallel transport on the frame bundle. Infinitesimal parallel transport in the frame bundle yields another description of an affine connection, either as a Cartan connection for the affine group or as a principal connection on the frame bundle.

The main invariants of an affine connection are its torsion and its curvature. The torsion measures how closely the Lie bracket of vector fields can be recovered from the affine connection. Affine connections may also be used to define (affine) geodesics on a manifold, generalizing the straight lines of Euclidean space, although the geometry of those straight lines can be very different from usual Euclidean geometry; the main differences are encapsulated in the curvature of the connection.

Motivation and history

A smooth manifold is a mathematical object which looks locally like a smooth deformation of Euclidean space : for example a smooth curve or surface looks locally like a smooth deformation of a line or a plane. Smooth functions and vector fields can be defined on manifolds, just as they can on Euclidean space, and scalar functions on manifolds can be differentiated in a natural way. However, differentiation of vector fields is less straightforward: this is a simple matter in Euclidean space, because the tangent space of based vectors at a point  can be identified naturally (by translation) with the tangent space at a nearby point . On a general manifold, there is no such natural identification between nearby tangent spaces, and so tangent vectors at nearby points cannot be compared in a well-defined way. The notion of an affine connection was introduced to remedy this problem by connecting nearby tangent spaces. The origins of this idea can be traced back to two main sources: surface theory and tensor calculus.

Motivation from surface theory

Consider a smooth surface  in 3-dimensional Euclidean space. Near to any point,  can be approximated by its tangent plane at that point, which is an affine subspace of Euclidean space. Differential geometers in the 19th century were interested in the notion of development in which one surface was rolled along another, without slipping or twisting. In particular, the tangent plane to a point of  can be rolled on : this should be easy to imagine when  is a surface like the 2-sphere, which is the smooth boundary of a convex region. This provides a way to identify the tangent planes at different points along the curve: in particular, a tangent vector in the tangent space at one point on the curve is identified with a unique tangent vector at any other point on the curve. These identifications are always given by affine transformations from one tangent plane to another.

This notion of parallel transport of tangent vectors, by affine transformations, along a curve has a characteristic feature: the point of contact of the tangent plane with the surface always moves with the curve under parallel translation (i.e., as the tangent plane is rolled along the surface, the point of contact moves). This generic condition is characteristic of Cartan connections. In more modern approaches, the point of contact is viewed as the origin in the tangent plane (which is then a vector space), and the movement of the origin is corrected by a translation, so that parallel transport is linear, rather than affine.

In the point of view of Cartan connections, however, the affine subspaces of Euclidean space are model surfaces — they are the simplest surfaces in Euclidean 3-space, and are homogeneous under the affine group of the plane — and every smooth surface has a unique model surface tangent to it at each point. These model surfaces are Klein geometries in the sense of Felix Klein's Erlangen programme. More generally, an -dimensional affine space is a Klein geometry for the affine group , the stabilizer of a point being the general linear group . An affine -manifold is then a manifold which looks infinitesimally like -dimensional affine space.

Motivation from tensor calculus

The second motivation for affine connections comes from the notion of a covariant derivative of vector fields. Before the advent of coordinate-independent methods, it was necessary to work with vector fields by embedding their respective Euclidean vectors into an atlas. These components can be differentiated, but the derivatives do not transform in a manageable way under changes of coordinates. Correction terms were introduced by Elwin Bruno Christoffel (following ideas of Bernhard Riemann) in the 1870s so that the (corrected) derivative of one vector field along another transformed covariantly under coordinate transformations — these correction terms subsequently came to be known as Christoffel symbols.

This idea was developed into the theory of absolute differential calculus (now known as tensor calculus) by Gregorio Ricci-Curbastro and his student Tullio Levi-Civita between 1880 and the turn of the 20th century.

Tensor calculus really came to life, however, with the advent of Albert Einstein's theory of general relativity in 1915. A few years after this, Levi-Civita formalized the unique connection associated to a Riemannian metric, now known as the Levi-Civita connection. More general affine connections were then studied around 1920, by Hermann Weyl, who developed a detailed mathematical foundation for general relativity, and Élie Cartan, who made the link with the geometrical ideas coming from surface theory.

Approaches

The complex history has led to the development of widely varying approaches to and generalizations of the affine connection concept.

The most popular approach is probably the definition motivated by covariant derivatives. On the one hand, the ideas of Weyl were taken up by physicists in the form of gauge theory and gauge covariant derivatives. On the other hand, the notion of covariant differentiation was abstracted by Jean-Louis Koszul, who defined (linear or Koszul) connections on vector bundles. In this language, an affine connection is simply a covariant derivative or (linear) connection on the tangent bundle.

However, this approach does not explain the geometry behind affine connections nor how they acquired their name. The term really has its origins in the identification of tangent spaces in Euclidean space by translation: this property means that Euclidean -space is an affine space. (Alternatively, Euclidean space is a principal homogeneous space or torsor under the group of translations, which is a subgroup of the affine group.) As mentioned in the introduction, there are several ways to make this precise: one uses the fact that an affine connection defines a notion of parallel transport of vector fields along a curve. This also defines a parallel transport on the frame bundle. Infinitesimal parallel transport in the frame bundle yields another description of an affine connection, either as a Cartan connection for the affine group  or as a principal  connection on the frame bundle.

Formal definition as a differential operator

 
 , that is,  is -linear in the first variable;
 , where  denotes the directional derivative; that is,  satisfies Leibniz rule in the second variable.

Elementary properties

Parallel transport for affine connections

Comparison of tangent vectors at different points on a manifold is generally not a well-defined process. An affine connection provides one way to remedy this using the notion of parallel transport, and indeed this can be used to give a definition of an affine connection.

Let  be a manifold with an affine connection . Then a vector field  is said to be parallel if  in the sense that for any vector field , . Intuitively speaking, parallel vectors have all their derivatives equal to zero and are therefore in some sense constant. Such tangent vectors are said to be parallel transports of each other.

, for all 
.
Formally, the first condition means that  is parallel with respect to the pullback connection on the pullback bundle . However, in a local trivialization it is a first-order system of linear ordinary differential equations, which has a unique solution for any initial condition given by the second condition (for instance, by the Picard–Lindelöf theorem).

Thus parallel transport provides a way of moving tangent vectors along a curve using the affine connection to keep them "pointing in the same direction" in an intuitive sense, and this provides a linear isomorphism between the tangent spaces at the two ends of the curve.

A linear isomorphism is determined by its action on an ordered basis or frame. Hence parallel transport can also be characterized as a way of transporting elements of the (tangent) frame bundle  along a curve.

Formal definition on the frame bundle

In more detail,  is a smooth map from the tangent bundle  of the frame bundle to the space of  matrices (which is the Lie algebra  of the Lie group  of invertible  matrices) satisfying two properties:

Conversely, an affine connection on the tangent bundle determines an affine connection on the frame bundle, for instance, by requiring that  vanishes on tangent vectors to the lifts of curves to the frame bundle defined by parallel transport.

Affine connections as Cartan connections

Affine connections can be defined within Cartan's general framework. In the modern approach, this is closely related to the definition of affine connections on the frame bundle. Indeed, in one formulation, a Cartan connection is an absolute parallelism of a principal bundle satisfying suitable properties. From this point of view the -valued one-form  on the frame bundle (of an affine manifold) is a Cartan connection. However, Cartan's original approach was different from this in a number of ways:
 the concept of frame bundles or principal bundles did not exist;
 a connection was viewed in terms of parallel transport between infinitesimally nearby points;
 this parallel transport was affine, rather than linear;
 the objects being transported were not tangent vectors in the modern sense, but elements of an affine space with a marked point, which the Cartan connection ultimately identifies with the tangent space.

Explanations and historical intuition

The points just raised are easiest to explain in reverse, starting from the motivation provided by surface theory. However these affine planes all have a marked point, the point of contact with the surface, and they are tangent to the surface at this point. The confusion therefore arises because an affine space with a marked point can be identified with its tangent space at that point. However, the parallel transport defined by rolling does not fix this origin: it is affine rather than linear; the linear parallel transport can be recovered by applying a translation.

This method is required to satisfy several properties:

These last two points are quite hard to make precise, so affine connections are more often defined infinitesimally. To motivate this, it suffices to consider how affine frames of reference transform infinitesimally with respect to parallel transport. (This is the origin of Cartan's method of moving frames.) The affine connection is then given symbolically by a first order differential system

defined by a collection of one-forms .

Since

The modern point of view makes all this intuition more precise using principal bundles (the essential idea is to replace a frame or a variable frame by the space of all frames and functions on this space). It also draws on the inspiration of Felix Klein's Erlangen programme, in which a geometry is defined to be a homogeneous space. Affine space is a geometry in this sense, and is equipped with a flat Cartan connection. Thus a general affine manifold is viewed as curved deformation of the flat model geometry of affine space.

Affine space as the flat model geometry

Definition of an affine space

Informally, an affine space is a vector space without a fixed choice of origin. It describes the geometry of points and free vectors in space. As a consequence of the lack of origin, points in affine space cannot be added together as this requires a choice of origin with which to form the parallelogram law for vector addition. The operation thus described  is the translation of  along . In technical terms, affine -space is a set  equipped with a free transitive action of the vector group  on it through this operation of translation of points:  is thus a principal homogeneous space for the vector group .

By analogy, the affine group  is the group of transformations of  preserving the affine structure. Thus  must preserve translations in the sense that

where  is a general linear transformation. Its kernel is the group of translations .

Affine frames and the flat affine connection
An affine frame for  consists of a point  and a basis  of the vector space .

On  there is a collection of  functions defined by

(as before) and

Furthermore:
 the Pfaffian system  (for all ) is integrable, and its integral manifolds are the fibres of the principal bundle . 

This can be done by pulling back  by the smooth map  defined by translation.

General affine geometries: formal definitions

An affine space, as with essentially any smooth Klein geometry, is a manifold equipped with a flat Cartan connection. More general affine manifolds or affine geometries are obtained easily by dropping the flatness condition expressed by the Maurer-Cartan equations. There are several ways to approach the definition and two will be given. Both definitions are facilitated by the realisation that 1-forms   in the flat model fit together to give a 1-form with values in the Lie algebra  of the affine group .

Definition via absolute parallelism

  for all  in the Lie algebra  of all  matrices;

Condition 3 is equivalent to the fact that this bundle homomorphism is an isomorphism. (However, this decomposition is a consequence of the rather special structure of the affine group.)

Definition as a principal affine connection

Relation to the motivation
The principal connection  defines an Ehresmann connection on this bundle, hence a notion of parallel transport. The Cartan condition ensures that the distinguished section  always moves under parallel transport.

Further properties

Curvature and torsion

Curvature and torsion are the main invariants of an affine connection. As there are many equivalent ways to define the notion of an affine connection, so there are many different ways to define curvature and torsion.

From the Cartan connection point of view, the curvature is the failure of the affine connection  to satisfy the Maurer–Cartan equation

By expanding  into the pair  and using the structure of the Lie algebra , this left hand side can be expanded into the two formulae

where the wedge products are evaluated using matrix multiplication. The first expression is called the torsion of the connection, and the second is also called the curvature.

These expressions are differential 2-forms on the total space of a frame bundle. However, they are horizontal and equivariant, and hence define tensorial objects.

The torsion is given by the formula

If the torsion vanishes, the connection is said to be torsion-free or symmetric.

The curvature is given by the formula

Note that  is the Lie bracket of vector fields

in Einstein notation. This is independent of coordinate system choice and

 

the tangent vector at point  of the th coordinate curve. The  are a natural basis for the tangent space at point , and the  the corresponding coordinates for the vector field .

When both curvature and torsion vanish, the connection defines a pre-Lie algebra structure on the space of global sections of the tangent bundle.

The Levi-Civita connection
 the connection is torsion-free, i.e.,  is zero, so that ;
 parallel transport is an isometry, i.e., the inner products (defined using ) between tangent vectors are preserved.
This connection is called the Levi-Civita connection.

The term "symmetric" is often used instead of torsion-free for the first property. The second condition means that the connection is a metric connection in the sense that the Riemannian metric  is parallel: . For a torsion-free connection, the condition is equivalent to the identity    +
, "compatibility with the metric".

Geodesics
Since straight lines are a concept in affine geometry, affine connections define a generalized notion of (parametrized) straight lines on any affine manifold, called affine geodesics.  Abstractly, a parametric curve  is a straight line if its tangent vector remains parallel and equipollent with itself when it is transported along .  From the linear point of view, an affine connection  distinguishes the affine geodesics in the following way: a smooth curve  is an affine geodesic if  is parallel transported along , that is

where  is the parallel transport map defining the connection.

In terms of the infinitesimal connection , the derivative of this equation implies

for all .

Conversely, any solution of this differential equation yields a curve whose tangent vector is parallel transported along the curve. This follows from the Picard–Lindelöf theorem, and allows for the definition of an exponential map associated to the affine connection.

The tangent vector to an affine geodesic is parallel and equipollent along itself. An unparametrized geodesic, or one which is merely parallel along itself without necessarily being equipollent, need only satisfy

for some function  defined along . Unparametrized geodesics are often studied from the point of view of projective connections.

Development

An affine connection defines a notion of development of curves.

In formal terms, let  be the linear parallel transport map associated to the affine connection.

Surface theory revisited
It is easy to see that this affine connection is torsion-free.

Example: the unit sphere in Euclidean space
It follows that a vector field  on  can be seen as a map  which satisfies

 

Denote as  the differential (Jacobian matrix) of such a map. Then we have:

Lemma. The formula

Proof. It is straightforward to prove that  satisfies the Leibniz identity and is  linear in the first variable. So all that needs to be proved here is that the map above does indeed define a tangent vector field. That is, we need to prove that for all  in 

Consider the map

The map f is constant, hence its differential vanishes. In particular

Equation 1 above follows. Q.E.D.

See also
Atlas (topology)
Connection (mathematics)
Connection (fibred manifold)
Connection (affine bundle)
Differentiable manifold
Differential geometry
Introduction to the mathematics of general relativity
Levi-Civita connection
List of formulas in Riemannian geometry
Riemannian geometry

Notes

Citations

References

Bibliography

Primary historical references

 
 
 
 

 Cartan's treatment of affine connections as motivated by the study of relativity theory.  Includes a detailed discussion of the physics of reference frames, and how the connection reflects the physical notion of transport along a worldline.
 
 A more mathematically motivated account of affine connections.
 .
 Affine connections from the point of view of Riemannian geometry.  Robert Hermann's appendices discuss the motivation from surface theory, as well as the notion of affine connections in the modern sense of Koszul.  He develops the basic properties of the differential operator ∇, and relates them to the classical affine connections in the sense of Cartan.

Secondary references

 .
 This is the main reference for the technical details of the article.  Volume 1, chapter III gives a detailed account of affine connections from the perspective of principal bundles on a manifold, parallel transport, development, geodesics, and associated differential operators.  Volume 1 chapter VI gives an account of affine transformations, torsion, and the general theory of affine geodesy.  Volume 2 gives a number of applications of affine connections to homogeneous spaces and complex manifolds, as well as to other assorted topics.
 .
 .
 Two articles by Lumiste, giving precise conditions on parallel transport maps in order that they define affine connections.  They also treat curvature, torsion, and other standard topics from a classical (non-principal bundle) perspective.
 .
 This fills in some of the historical details, and provides a more reader-friendly elementary account of Cartan connections in general.  Appendix A elucidates the relationship between the principal connection and absolute parallelism viewpoints.  Appendix B bridges the gap between the classical "rolling" model of affine connections, and the modern one based on principal bundles and differential operators.

Connection (mathematics)
Differential geometry
Maps of manifolds
Smooth functions

de:Zusammenhang (Differentialgeometrie)#Linearer Zusammenhang